is a public university in Sengendai, Koshigaya, Saitama, Japan. The school was established in 1999.

External links
 Official website 

Educational institutions established in 1999
Public universities in Japan
Universities and colleges in Saitama Prefecture
1999 establishments in Japan
Koshigaya, Saitama